Piotr Lisek (born 16 August 1992) is a Polish athlete specialising in the pole vault. He won bronze medals at the 2015 and 2019 World Championships and the silver medal at the 2017 World Championships. He is the first Polish vaulter to jump over 6 meters.

His personal bests in the event are 6.02 metres outdoors (Monaco 2019) and 6.00 metres indoors (Potsdam 2017).

Career
Lisek began his career as a high jumper, but later switched to pole vault, having decided he was too short for his original event. He was coached by Vyacheslav Kalinichenko, who also trained Monika Pyrek, one of the most successful Polish female pole vaulters.

At the 2012 Polish Championships, he tested positive for an illegal substance, methylhexanamine, and was banned for six months. The athlete stated that he took the substance unknowingly in an energy drink and even listed it with the supplements he was using before the anti-doping control, which contributed to the reduced period of suspension.

Lisek's international debut was at the 2013 European Indoor Championships where he did not go through the qualifying round. Also at the 2013 European U23 Championships, he did not manage to reach the final. His big breakthrough came in 2014, when he jumped 5.77 metres in the indoor season. However, despite regularly jumping over 5.75 metres, he did not make the team for the 2014 IAAF World Indoor Championships, which took place in Poland, after no marking at the national championships. He had more success in the outdoor season, jumping 5.82 metres and finishing sixth at the 2014 European Championships. 2015 proved to be even more successful for the Polish vaulter with a new national indoor record of 5.90 metres and the bronze at the 2015 European Indoor Championships, his first international medal.

In February 2017, Lisek improved his personal record and jumped to a new Polish record, clearing 6.00 meters in Potsdam competition. Thus he became the 10th vaulter in history to clear 6.00 meters indoors. On 5 July 2019, during IAAF Diamond League meeting in Lausanne, Lisek cleared 6.01 meters, setting new Polish record and becoming the first Polish pole vaulter to clear 6 meters outdoors. One week later, he improved this record to 6.02 meters during a meeting in Monaco.

Competition record

See also
6 metres club

References

External links

1992 births
Living people
Polish male pole vaulters
Doping cases in athletics
Polish sportspeople in doping cases
World Athletics Championships athletes for Poland
World Athletics Championships medalists
People from Szamotuły County
Athletes (track and field) at the 2016 Summer Olympics
Olympic athletes of Poland
Sportspeople from Greater Poland Voivodeship
Athletes (track and field) at the 2020 Summer Olympics
20th-century Polish people
21st-century Polish people